Dinant is a city and municipality of Wallonia located in the province of Namur, Belgium.

The municipality consists of the following districts: Anseremme, Bouvignes-sur-Meuse, Dinant, Dréhance, Falmagne, Falmignoul, Foy-Notre-Dame, Furfooz, Lisogne, Sorinnes and Thynes.

Geography
Dinant is positioned in the Upper Meuse valley, at a point where the river cuts deeply into the western Condroz plateau.  Sited in a steep sided valley, between the rock face and the river. The original settlement had little space in which to grow away from the river, and it therefore expanded into a long, thin town, on a north-south axis, along the river shore. During the 19th century, the former Île des Batteurs (Drummers' Island) to the south was attached directly to the town when a branch of the Meuse was filled in.

Dinant has been enriched by the agricultural opportunities presented by the fertile land on the plateau that overlooks it. Within the town, brassware production is a traditional craft that has benefited from the presence of the broad and, at this point, easily navigable river which has facilitated easy delivery of the raw materials and ready distribution of the resulting products of the artisans' workshops. Another traditional source of wealth is provided by the limestone cliffs overlooking the town, which supported a high-end quarrying industry, producing black marble and bluestone, and whose distribution also benefited from the proximity of the relatively wide and deep navigable river.

History

Origins to the 10th century
The name Dinant comes from the Celtic Divo-Nanto, meaning "Sacred Valley" or "Divine Valley"; it can also be translated as "Celestial Gorge" or "Luminous Gorge" (as in modern Welsh Nant Dwyfol).

The Dinant area was already populated in Neolithic, Celtic, and Roman times.  The first mention of Dinant as a settlement dates from the 7th century, when Perpète of Maastricht, Bishop of Tongeren, moved his principal residence from Maastricht to Dinant and founded the church of Saint Vincent.  In 870, Charles the Bald gave part of Dinant to be administered by the Count of Namur, the other part by the Bishopric of Tongeren, which was by that time based in Liège.

In the 11th century, the emperor Henry IV granted several rights over Dinant to the Prince-Bishopric of Liège, including market and justice rights.  From that time on, the city became one of the 23 ‘‘bonnes villes’’ (or principal cities) of the Prince-Bishopric.  The first stone bridge on the Meuse and major repair to the castle, which had been built earlier, also date from the end of the 11th century.  Throughout this period, and until the end of the 18th century, Dinant shared its history with its overlord Liège, sometimes rising in revolt against it, sometimes partaking in its victories and defeats, mostly against the neighbouring County of Namur.

Late Middle Ages

Its strategic location on the Meuse exposed Dinant to battle and pillage, not always by avowed enemies: in 1466, Philip the Good, Duke of Burgundy, uncle of Louis de Bourbon, Prince-Bishop of Liège, and Philip’s son Charles the Bold punished an uprising in Dinant during the Liège Wars, by casting 800 burghers into the Meuse and setting fire to the city. The city's economic rival was Bouvignes, downriver on the opposite shore of the Meuse.

Late Medieval Dinant and Bouvignes specialised in metalwork, producing finely cast and finished objects in a silvery brass alloy, called dinanderie and supplying aquamaniles, candlesticks, patens and other altar furniture throughout the Meuse valley (giving these objects their cautious designation "Mosan"), the Rhineland and beyond.

Henri Pirenne gained his doctorate in 1883 with a thesis on medieval Dinant.

The Old Regime and World War I

In the 16th and 17th centuries, wars between France and Spain, Dinant suffered destruction, famine and epidemics, despite its neutrality.  In 1675, the French army under Marshal François de Créquy occupied the city.  Dinant was briefly taken by the Austrians at the end of the 18th century.  The whole Bishopric of Liège was ceded to France in 1795.  The dinanderies fell out of fashion and the economy of the city now rested on leather tanning and the manufacture of playing cards.  The famous couques de Dinant also appeared at that time.

The city suffered devastation again at the beginning of the First World War. On 15 August 1914, French and German troops fought for the town in the Battle of Dinant; among the wounded was Lieut. Charles de Gaulle. On 23 August, 674 inhabitants were summarily executed by Saxon troops of the German Army – the biggest massacre committed by the Germans in 1914. Within a month, some five thousand Belgian and French civilians were killed by the Germans at numerous similar occasions.

Sights

The city's landmark is the Collegiate Church of Notre Dame de Dinant. It was rebuilt in Gothic style on its old foundations after falling rocks from the adjacent cliff partially destroyed the former Romanesque style church in 1227. Several stages for a pair of towers on the west end were completed before the project was abandoned in favour of the present central tower with a famous onion dome and facetted multi-staged lantern.
Above the church rises the vertical flank of the rocher surmounted by the fortified Citadel of Dinant that was first built in the 11th century to control the Meuse valley.  The Prince-Bishopric of Liège rebuilt and enlarged it in 1530; the French destroyed it in 1703. Its present aspect, with the rock-hewn stairs (408 steps), is due to rebuilding in 1821, during the United Kingdom of the Netherlands phase of Dinant's chequered history. A cable car is available during the high season to take visitors from the Collegiate Church of Notre-Dame to the top of the Citadel.
Apart from the main block is the Rocher Bayard that was said to have been split by giant hoof of Bayard, the giant horse carrying the four sons of Duke Aymon on their legendary flight from Charlemagne through the Ardennes, told in Les Quatre Fils Aymon, a famous 12th-century chanson de geste. In reality the rock has been divided by the soldiers of Louis XIV after the conquest of Dinant in order to construct a road alongside the Meuse. 
The house of Adolphe Sax, inventor of the saxophone located in the street of the same name. A little museum, the Mr Sax's House, pays attention to his life and saxophones.

Gastronomic culture 

The Flamiche dinantaise is the local version of quiche made with a cheese called "boulette de Romedenne".
The couque de Dinant is Europe's hardest biscuit, with a honey-sweetened flavour that is impressed with a carved wooden mould before baking.
The beer brand Leffe originates from Dinant and there is a museum there.

Transport 
Dinant's railway station is on the left bank of the river. There is hourly train service to Brussels, about a 90-minute ride.

Healthcare 
Dinant hosts the Saint-Vincent and Saint-Anne sites (Centre Hospitalier de Dinant) of the CHU UCLouvain Namur university hospital, the provinces' largest employer and serving as teaching hospital for the University of Louvain.

Born in Dinant 

David of Dinant, philosopher (birth in Dinant is uncertain, 12th century)
Joachim Patinir or Patenier, 1485–1524, the first specialist landscape painter
Antoine Joseph Wiertz, painter (19th century)
Adolphe Sax, inventor of the saxophone (19th century)
Georges Pire, priest of the Dominican Order and Nobel Peace Prize recipient for 1958
André-Eugène Pirson (Dinant, 21 March 1817-Brussels, 28 December 1881), governor of the National Bank of Belgium (NBB) from 1877 until 1881
André Buzin, artist and stamp designer (20th century)
Alex Miskirtchian, boxer

Twin cities and twinning 

: Cagayan de Oro
: Hoddesdon, England
: Chios
: Dinan
: Disneyland Paris

See also
Rape of Belgium
Auxbrebis

References

External links 

Official web site in French, Dutch, and English
Dinant groups on Flickr
Citadel of Dinant: Official web site
Map of Dinant with localisation of Adolphe Sax House

 
Cities in Wallonia
Sub-municipalities of Dinant
Municipalities of Namur (province)
Wallonia's Major Heritage